Copil (Romanian: child) is a Romanian surname. Notable people with the surname include:
Dumitru Copil (born 1990), Romanian footballer
Marius Copil (born 1990),  Romanian tennis player

See also
Alerta Răpire Copil, child abduction alert system in Romania.
Copil (son of Malinalxochitl), mythical child of the Aztec goddess Malinalxochitl.

Romanian-language surnames